Albert Williamson Durley (October 15, 1841 – March 12, 1914) was an American politician and lawyer.

Born in Hennepin, Illinois, Durley studied at Wheaton College in Wheaton, Illinois and at Yale University. He then taught school in Illinois and studied law. In 1869, Durley was admitted to the Illinois bar and practiced law in Hennepin, Illinois. In 1875, he moved to Le Mars, Iowa and continued to practice law and was in the real estate business. Then, in 1892, Durley moved to Superior, Wisconsin and continue to practice law. In 1907, Durley was elected to the Wisconsin State Assembly as a Republican. Durley died in Superior, Wisconsin and was buried in Le Mars, Iowa.

Notes

1841 births
1914 deaths
People from Hennepin, Illinois
People from Le Mars, Iowa
Politicians from Superior, Wisconsin
Wheaton College (Illinois) alumni
Yale University alumni
Educators from Illinois
Illinois lawyers
Iowa lawyers
Wisconsin lawyers
Republican Party members of the Wisconsin State Assembly
19th-century American politicians
19th-century American lawyers